Santiago Segundo Salfate Núñez (12 January 1916 – 24 September 2010) was a Chilean footballer.

Career
He played in eleven matches for the Chile national football team from 1942 to 1946. He was also part of Chile's squad for the 1942 South American Championship.

At club level, he began his career in Unión Pueblo Nuevo and the team of Iquique, becoming amateur national champion. Next, he played for Colo-Colo and Green Cross.

He also had a brief career as manager since he coached Coquimbo Unido in 1959.

References

External links
 
 Santiago Salfate at PartidosdeLaRoja.com 

1916 births
2010 deaths
People from Iquique
Chilean footballers
Chile international footballers
Association football defenders
Colo-Colo footballers
Club de Deportes Green Cross footballers
Chilean Primera División players
Chilean football managers
Coquimbo Unido managers
Primera B de Chile managers